Bently may refer to:

People
Donald E. Bently (1924–2012), an American entrepreneur and engineer
Fenis Bently (fl. 1905–1911), an American football coach
Nelson Bentley (1918–1990), an American poet and professor 
Peter Bently (born 1960), a British children's writer
Bently Elliott, an American writer and President Reagan's speechwriter
Bently Spang (born 1960), a Northern Cheyenne artist, writer, and curator

Places
Bently Nob Hill, an apartment building in Nob Hill, San Francisco, U.S.
Bently Reserve, the Old Federal Reserve Bank of San Francisco Building, U.S.

Other uses
Bently Nevada, the Condition Monitoring and Protection division of Baker Hughes
Jim Bently, a fictional character in short stories by Henry Lawson

See also

Bentley (disambiguation)
 Bentleigh (disambiguation)